Brickellia peninsularis is a Mexican species of flowering plants in the family Asteraceae. It is native to western Mexico in the states of Baja California, Baja California Sur, and Colima.

References

peninsularis
Endemic flora of Mexico
Flora of Baja California
Flora of Baja California Sur
Flora of Colima
Plants described in 1903
Taxa named by Townshend Stith Brandegee